Management by objectives (MBO), also known as management by planning (MBP), was first popularized by Peter Drucker in his 1954 book The Practice of Management. Management by objectives is the process of defining specific objectives within an organization that management can convey to organization members, then deciding how to achieve each objective in sequence. This process allows managers to take work that needs to be done one step at a time to allow for a calm, yet productive work environment. In this system of management, individual goals are synchronized with the goals of the organization.

An important part of MBO is the measurement and comparison of an employee's actual performance with the standards set. Ideally, when employees themselves have been involved with the goal-setting and choosing the course of action to be followed by them, they are more likely to fulfill their responsibilities.

According to George S. Odiorne, the system of management by objectives can be described as a process whereby the superior and subordinate jointly identify common goals, define each individual's major areas of responsibility in terms of the results expected of him or her, and use these measures as guides for operating the unit and assessing the contribution of each of its members. MBO refers to the process of setting goals for the employees so that they know what they are supposed to do at the workplace. Management by Objectives defines roles and responsibilities for the employees and help them chalk out their future course of action in the organization.

History Of MBO 
Peter Drucker first used the term "management by objectives" in his 1954 book The Practice of Management. While the basic ideas of MBO were not original to Drucker, they pulled from other management practices to create a complete 'system'. The idea draws on the many ideas presented in Mary Parker Follett's 1926 essay, The Giving of Orders.

After the term and idea were brought up, Drucker's student, George Odiorne, continued to develop the idea in his book Management Decisions by Objectives, published in the mid-1960s. MBO was popularized by companies like Hewlett-Packard, who claimed it led to their success.

Concept and framework 

Management by objectives at its core is the process of employers/supervisors attempting to manage their subordinates by introducing a set of specific goals that both the employee and the company strive to achieve in the near future, and working to meet those goals accordingly.

Five steps: 
Review organizational goal 
Set worker objective 
Monitor progress 
Evaluation 
Give reward

Companies that use MBO often report greater sales rates and productiveness within the organization. Objectives can be set in all domains of activities, such as production, marketing, services, sales, R&D, human resources, finance, and information systems. Some objectives are collective, and some can be goals for each individual worker. Both make the task at hand seem attainable and enable the workers to visualize what needs to be done and how.

Application in practice 
There are endless ways to exercise management by objectives. One must find specific goals to aim for in an organization or business. Many noteworthy companies have used MBO. The management at the computer company Hewlett-Packard (HP) has said that it considers the policy a huge component of its success. Many other corporations praise the effectiveness of MBO, including Xerox, DuPont, Intel, and countless others. Companies that use MBO often report greater sales rates and productiveness within the organization. Objectives can be set in all domains of activities, such as production, marketing, services, sales, R&D, human resources, finance, and information systems. Some objectives are collective, and some can be goals for each worker. Both make the task at hand seem attainable and enable the workers to visualize what needs to be done and how.

In the MBO paradigm, managers determine the enterprise's mission and strategic goals. The goals set by top-level managers are based on an analysis of what can and should be accomplished by the organization within a specific period of time. The functions of these managers can be centralized by appointing a project manager who can monitor and control the activities of the various departments. If this cannot be done or is not desirable, each manager's contributions to the organizational goal should be clearly spelled out.

In many large Japanese corporations, beginning in the late 1990s, MBO was used as the basis of "the performance-based merit system” (seika-shugi) which used clear numerical targets to measure performance in contrast to the previous system of non-specific contracts in Japanese companies.

Objectives need quantifying and monitoring. Reliable management information systems are needed to establish relevant objectives and monitor their "reach ratio" in an objective way. Pay incentives (bonuses) are often linked to results in reaching the objectives.

The mnemonic S.M.A.R.T. is associated with the process of setting objectives in this paradigm. 'SMART' objectives are:
 Specific: Target a specific area for improvement
 Measurable: Quantify or suggest an indicator of progress
 Assignable: Specify who will do it
 Realistic: State what results can realistically be achieved, given available resources
 Time-bound: Specify when the result(s) can be achieved
The aphorism "what gets measured gets done" is aligned with the MBO philosophy.

Limitations
MBO has its detractors and attention notably among them W. Edwards Deming, who argued that a lack of understanding of systems commonly results in the misapplication of objectives. Additionally, Deming stated that setting production targets will encourage workers to meet those targets through whatever means necessary, which usually results in poor quality.

Point 7 of Deming's key principles encourages managers to abandon objectives in favour of leadership because he felt that a leader with an understanding of systems was more likely to guide workers to an appropriate solution than the incentive of an objective. Deming also pointed out that Drucker warned managers that a systemic view was required and felt that Drucker's warning went largely unheeded by the practitioners of MBO.

There are limitations in the underlying assumptions about the impact of management by objectives:
 It over-emphasizes the setting of goals over the working of a plan as a driver of outcomes.
 It under-emphasizes the importance of the environment or context in which the goals are set.

That context includes everything from the availability and quality of resources, to relative buy-in by leadership and stake-holders. As an example of the influence of management buy-in as a contextual influencer, in a 1991 comprehensive review of thirty years of research on the impact of Management by Objectives, Robert Rodgers and John Hunter concluded that companies whose CEOs demonstrated high commitment to MBO showed, on average, a 56% gain in productivity. Companies with CEOs who showed low commitment only saw a 6% gain in productivity.

When this approach is not properly set, agreed and managed by organizations, self-centered employees might be prone to distort results, falsely representing achievement of targets that were set in a short-term, narrow fashion. In this case, managing by objectives would be counterproductive.

The limitations mentioned above, combined with the challenges faced by modern service companies, have led to the development of methods that integrate aspects of MBO but appear to be significantly more effective in application. These include, for example, the Objectives and key results (OKR) method, which was developed by John Doerr (among others) and has been used successfully in many companies, notably at Google. Agile management techniques also have a strong emphasis on goals. The group of management techniques that are based on goals, with a strong focus on engagement, team motivation and leadership, can be summarized as Management by Goals methods.

Recent research 
Management by Objectives is still practiced today, with a focus on planning and development aiding various organizations. The most recent research focuses on specific industries, specifying the practice of MBO for each. In addition, following criticism of the original MBO approach, a new formula was introduced in 2016, aiming at revitalizing it, that is the OPTIMAL MBO, which stands for its components, namely: (O) Objectives, Outside-in; (P) Profitability (budget) related goals; (T) Target Setting; (I) Incentives & Influence; (M) Measurement; (A) Agreement, Accountability, Appraisal, Appreciation; and (L) Leadership Support.

While the practice is used today, it may go by different names – the letters "MBO" have lost their formality, and future planning is a more standard practice.

See also
 Decision-making software
 Objectives, Goals, Strategy, Measure (OGSM)
 Objectives and key results (OKR)
 Peter Drucker School of Management
 Management styles

References

Management by type